Shri Khushal Das University (SKDU and SKD University) is an Indian Private university located in Hanumangarh, Rajasthan. It was established after the Rajasthan's assembly passed the Shri Khushal Das University, Pilibanga Bill, 2018.

References

External links

Universities in Rajasthan
Private universities in India
2018 establishments in Rajasthan
Educational institutions established in 2018